Dr. Flinder Anderson Khonglam (6 February 1945 – 22 May 2012) was an Indian politician and physician. He served as the eighth Chief Minister of Meghalaya from 2001 to 2003. Khonglam was the first independent legislator to serve as the Chief Minister of any Indian state in history.

Biography

Early life and career
Khonglam was born in Malki, Shillong, Assam (now Meghalaya) on 6 February 1945. He was the oldest of eight children born to his parents, Richard N. Lyngdoh and L. Khonglam. He was a doctor, working at Nazareth Hospital and several other government-owned medical facilities in the state.

Political career
Khonglam represented the Sohra (Cherrapunji) constituency in the Meghalaya Legislative Assembly for almost twenty years. He first ran for the Assembly in 1978, but was defeated in the election by an opponent from the Hill State People's Democratic Party (HSPDP). However, Khonglam, an independent won the 1983 state election by defeating an incumbent from the HSPDP. In 1988, Khonglam lost his seat in the Assembly to an opponent from the Indian National Congress.

He was re-elected in to the Meghalaya Assembly in 1993 as an independent. He was re-elected to two more consecutive terms from the same constituency thereafter. He won re-election during the 1990s as an independent. Khonglam was elected again in 2003, this time as a candidate for the Hill State People's Democratic Party (HSPDP).

He also headed the Peoples Forum of Meghalaya (PFM) and represented Sohra within the Khasi Hills Autonomous District Council (KHADC).

Chief Minister of Meghalaya
Khonglam's predecessor, former Chief Minister E.K. Mawlong, was forced to resign from office due to scandal involving the construction of the Meghalaya House in Kolkata. Khonglam became Chief Minister of Meghalaya on 8 December 2001. He became the first independent Chief Minister of an Indian state in history. He became Chief Minister through the support of the Nationalist Congress Party (NCP), led by P. A. Sangma, which formed a coalition government with the Congress Party. Khonglam served as Chief Minister until 4 March 2003.

Later life
Khonglam was defeated for re-election in the 2008 legislative election by Dr. P.W. Khongjee of the Indian National Congress party.

He suffered from diabetes, which contributed to health problems in his later life, including one documented diabetic stroke. Khonglam fainted at his home in Laitumkhrah, Shillong, on 22 May 2012. He was taken to Bethany Hospital in Shillong, where he died at 6:30 p.m. IST on 22 May 2012, at the age of 67. Khonglam was buried in a cemetery in Malki. Dignitaries in attendance at the funeral included the Meghalaya Deputy Chief Ministers, Bindo Lanong and Rowell Lyngdoh, and Hopingstone Lingdoh, the leader of the Hill State People's Democratic Party.

References

1945 births
2012 deaths
Chief Ministers of Meghalaya
20th-century Indian medical doctors
People from Shillong
State cabinet ministers of Meghalaya
Meghalaya politicians
Scientists from Meghalaya
Hill State People's Democratic Party politicians
Indian National Congress politicians from Manipur
Meghalaya MLAs 1983–1988
Meghalaya MLAs 1993–1998
Meghalaya MLAs 1998–2003
Meghalaya MLAs 2003–2008